The 1991–92 Courage National 4 South was the fifth full season of rugby union within the fourth tier of the English league system, currently known as National League 2 South.  At the end of the campaign, Havant finished as champions, just edging Hampshire rivals Basingstoke by virtue of a better for/against record to gain promotion to the 1992–93 National Division 3. 

At the other end of the table Ealing and Sidcup finished in the relegation zone.  Of the two Sidcup put up the better fight but ended up being relegated in 12th place despite being tied with two other clubs on 6 points each due to a poorer for/against record.  Both clubs would be relegated to London 1 for the following season.

Structure
Each team played one match against each of the other teams, playing a total of twelve matches each. The champions are promoted to National Division 3 and the bottom two teams are relegated to either London Division 1 or South West 1 depending on their locality.

Participating teams and locations

League table

Sponsorship
National League 4 South is part of the Courage Clubs Championship and is sponsored by Courage Brewery.

References

N4
National League 2 South